Cockfield Football Club was an association football team from the village of Cockfield, County Durham in the north of England which was dubbed the "Village Wonder Team" in the 1920s after achieving success in the national FA Amateur Cup.  The club's fortunes later declined significantly and it folded in 2010.

History
It is not known when Cockfield F.C. was formed, but the club won the championship of the Wear Valley League in the 1907–08 season.  Cockfield joined the Northern League, at the time the leading amateur league in northern England, in 1921 and finished in the top half of the table for five consecutive seasons.  In the 1922–23 season, the club reached the semi-finals of the FA Amateur Cup, losing to Evesham Town.  This achievement by a team from a "two-street pit village" led to the club gaining the epithet the "Village Wonder Team" in football circles.

In the 1927–28 season the village side, consisting entirely of unemployed coalminers, again reached the semi-finals of the FA Amateur Cup and this time defeated Willington to reach the final.  The final was played at Ayresome Park, Middlesbrough, where Cockfield twice took the lead but eventually lost 3–2 to the holders Leyton in front of over 12,000 spectators.  Cockfield played in the Northern League until 29 November 1939, when the club resigned its place in the league.  The club continued to compete after the Second World War and in the early 1950s played in the Durham Central League and scored a surprise Amateur Cup win over South Bank of the Northern League.  Cockfield also played in the qualifying rounds of the FA Cup, with minimal success, until at least the 1958–59 season.

The club continued to compete in local leagues into the 21st century.  In the 2002–03 season the club competed in the Durham Alliance.  By 2006 the club was playing in the very minor Crook and District League and its home ground at Hazel Grove was in an extreme state of dereliction. Although there had once been a grandstand and pavilion, there was little left except for a rail around the pitch and the dugouts.  Lack of funding from the parish council for repairs to the changing rooms at Hazel Grove ultimately led to the club folding in 2010.

Former players
1. Players that have played/managed in the Football League or any foreign
equivalent to this level (i.e. fully professional league).
2. Players with full international caps.
3. Players that hold a club record or have captained the club.
  Jack Holliday

References

Defunct football clubs in England
Defunct football clubs in County Durham
Association football clubs disestablished in 2010
2010 disestablishments in England
Cockfield, County Durham